Five referendums were held in Switzerland during 1997. The first three were held on 8 June on two popular initiatives "EU accession talks in front of the people" and "for a ban on arms exports" and a federal resolution on ending the federal monopoly on producing and selling gunpowder. The two popular initiatives were both rejected, whilst the end of the gunpowder monopoly was approved.

The last two were held on 28 September on a federal resolution on financing unemployment insurance and a popular initiative "youth without drugs". Both were rejected by voters.

Results

References

See also 
 Switzerland–European Union relations

1997 elections in Switzerland
1997 referendums
Referendums in Switzerland
Referendums related to European Union accession
Switzerland–European Union relations